The Southern Football Netball League is an Australian rules football league, based in the south and south eastern suburbs of Melbourne, Victoria, for both seniors and juniors.

History
The South East Suburban Football League was formed in 1963 as a merger of the Caulfield Oakleigh District Football League with the East Suburban Football League after a number of its clubs moved to the Croydon Ferntree Gully FL (now Eastern Football League).

When the Federal Football League folded at the end of 1981, the SESFL had twenty clubs. After the addition of all but one of the Federal clubs for 1982, the league had a 16 team A grade, and a 12 team B grade competition. The league twice tried 3 divisions but the idea was later dropped as clubs left or folded.

In a major project in 1991, the league underwent a major revamp of its administration and opted to employ a full-time administrator and staff to manage the league's affairs. The League's administration along with its member clubs undertook a far-reaching corporate planning programme to map out future directions and objectives. The extra manpower allowed the elevation of League and club standards and the improved marketability of attracting the corporate sponsorship that modern football now required to keep the organisation afloat. Much of this work was completed by early 1992 and it was decided that a new name would be required to flow on from the work already achieved. The Southern Football League was adopted to show that a new professionalism was running football in the southern suburbs.

The league had another major change in 1993, when it absorbed the Eastern Suburbs Churches Football Association. The newly merged league began in 1993 with around 50 clubs playing 5 divisions, though this had dropped to 28 clubs in 3 divisions by 2002 due to clubs folding, merging, or moving to other competitions.

In April 1997, the Southern Football Show began on Optus Vision's Localvision channel, covering the weekly news of the league. It moved to Channel 31 Melbourne the following year. This program soon became known as the Southern Footy Show. It later expanded its scope to become the Local Footy Show, covering many Melbourne leagues until 2011.

In the new millennium, the league grew slightly with the addition of the Southern Dragons in 2009, Endeavour Hills in 2011 and Hallam in 2012.  The Dragons returned to the VAFA after the 2012 season, but the revival of Carrum Patterson Lakes FC in 2013 after almost 20 years in recess kept the league at 31 clubs.

The 2014 SFL third division seniors grand final was called off after a brawl broke out between players and supporters. The game in which Mount Waverley was taking on Carrum Patterson Lakes. A police spokeswoman said supporters started heckling one of the teams as it left the ground at half-time. A fight broke out and one person was treated in hospital. The game was called off when one of the teams refused to return to the field."

In 2015, acknowledging the netball part of the competition, the league changed its name to Southern Football Netball League.  The 2015 season was also a time when the Southern Dragons went into recess.

In 2016 Port Melbourne Colts transferred in from Western Region Football League, and Lyndhurst FC fielded a senior side for the first time.

2017 saw the introduction of women's football.

The inclusion of 3 clubs enabled the league to have 4 men's divisions for 2018.

Premiers

South East Suburban FL premiers

Current Clubs (2023 season)

Division 1

Division 2

Division 3

Division 4

Thirds Only

Women's Division 1

Women's Division 2

Previous Clubs

Folded/In Recess

Merged

Moved to Eastern Football League

Moved to Mornington Peninsula Nepean Football League
Carrum Downs Football Club

Moved to Northern Football League
Lower Plenty Football Club

Moved to Victorian Amateur Football Association

Moved to Yarra Valley Mountain District Football League/Outer East FNL
Boronia Park Football Club 1999
Hallam Football Netball Club 2023

References

External links 
 Official SFNL website

 
Australian rules football competitions in Victoria (Australia)
Netball leagues in Victoria (Australia)